AOK may refer to:

Language
 A-ok, an expression popularized by Shorty Powers
 A-OK hand gesture, symbolized by a joined thumb and forefinger with remaining fingers extended

Places
 Karpathos Island National Airport, IATA airport code

Organizations
 Armeeoberkommando, the name of various army commands in the Austro-Hungarian army and German army, especially in the world wars
AOK Kerkyra, a Greek football club, known as PAE AOK Kerkyra since 2012
 A.O. Karditsa F.C., a Greek football club commonly called by their abbreviated name "AOK"

Arts and entertainment
 AOK (album), Mandaryna's album, or the title track
 "A-O-K" (song), a 2021 song by Tai Verdes
 "A-OK", a song by Australian band Violent Soho from their 2020 album Everything Is A-OK

Games
 Age of Empires II: The Age of Kings computer game
 Age of Empires: The Age of Kings Nintendo DS game

Other uses
 Assisted-opening knife

See also
Ayokay